

Statistics 

The following graphs show the evolution of the pandemic starting from 2 March 2020, the day the first cases were confirmed in the country.

Cumulative cases

Nationwide

Daily cases 

|

Total confirmed cases by age and gender 
The following chart displays the proportion of total cases by age and gender on August 20, 2021.

Total confirmed deaths

Severe cases

Total confirmed deaths by age and gender 
The following chart displays the proportion of total deaths by age and gender on December 6, 2021.

Confirmed cases and deaths, by region

The following graph shows the daily cases of COVID-19 for each region of Portugal (updated on the 10th of June) according to DGS visualising the table above.

Similarly, the following graph presents the daily deaths by COVID-19 for each region of Portugal (updated on the 10th of June) according to DGS.

Growth of cases by Municipalities  

The following graph presents the total number of COVID-19 cases per day for the municipalities of Portugal with more than 1000 confirmed cases (updated on 30 May), according to the Data Science for Social Good Portugal.

2009–20 deaths cases comparison 

According to the Portuguese mortality surveillance (EVM), the following chart presents the total number of deaths per day in Portugal for the years 2009–2020 (updated on 10 June).

In the following two graphs, the total deaths per day and by age group are presented for the years 2019 and 2020.

References 

statistics
Portugal